Harringay Stadium was a major greyhound racing and motorcycle speedway venue in Harringay, north London. It was built and opened in 1927 and closed in 1987.

Construction
Harringay Stadium was the third greyhound racing stadium to open in Britain. It was owned by the Greyhound Racing Association Ltd (GRA). After great success with their first track at Belle Vue in Manchester in 1926, they opened both White City and Harringay stadiums in 1927.

The driving force behind the GRA, and its managing director until the 1960s, was Brigadier-General Alfred Critchley, who wrote in his autobiography that, when he first learned of greyhound racing, "It immediately occurred to me that this might prove to be the poor man's racecourse". Apparently his interest in how the lower-paid classes were losing money by backing horses was born out of concern for his valet who lost large sums betting on horse racing.

Harringay Stadium was constructed by Messrs T.G. Simpson of Victoria Street, London, at a cost of £35,000. The  site had been the Williamson's Pottery Works from the late 18th century through to the early 1900s. It was then used as a dumping ground for the spoil from the construction of the Piccadilly line to Finsbury Park.

On completion, the rather awkward structure had a capacity of 50,000. The main stand running along the north of the site seated 3,000. The remaining 47,000 spectators were accommodated on terracing constructed on earth banking. When it opened the stadium was originally called Harringay Park.

There were a number of additions to the stadium in the years after construction, including a number of smaller stands around the track and the construction of a restaurant in the main stand. One of the most renowned additions was the Australian-invented Julius totalisator. This electro-mechanical computer, installed in 1930 and extended and upgraded in 1948, saw continuous service until the stadium was closed in 1987.

Greyhound racing

Opening
The opening night was on Tuesday 13 September 1927 and drew in a crowd of 35,000, and the racing was dampened by persistent rain all evening. The opening race was the Chorley Wood Stakes, and it was won by Baltard Castle over 500 yards in a time of 30.80 sec at 3–1 for trainer Sid Jennings. Another greyhound racing that evening was Ever Bright trained by John 'Jack' Kennedy and although only finishing third he would finish as runner-up in the 1927 English Greyhound Derby less than one month later. The original trainers were Kennedy, Jennings, William Spoor, Harry Buck and Reginald Grey. Track lighting was seen as a first-time experience by most (football did not have floodlights for another 30 years).

Pre war history
In 1927 the GRA set up the Hook estate at Northaw for GRA trainers to train out off for White City Stadium and Harringay. The 140 acres of park and grassland was used for greyhounds over nine months old and could house 600 dogs. The pups under nine months were reared under the supervision of William Skerratt on farms in and around Blythe Bridge near Stoke-on-Trent before graduating to Northaw.

Bendeemer trained by Jack Kennedy finished fourth in the 1928 English Greyhound Derby final before the Mick the Miller appeared at Harringay for the only time in 1929. He defeated the Billy Chandler (grandfather of Victor Chandler) owned Bishops Dream in a match race on 11 December.

Two further Greyhound Derby final appearances in 1931 and 1932 by Brunswick Bill and Fret Not respectively were followed by the arrival of two trainers called Leslie Reynolds and Jack Harvey; the latter would provide Harringay with their first Derby champion in Davesland in the 1934 English Greyhound Derby.

The track was the first to race a steeplechase in 1934, which featured a hurdle, a water jump, a collapsible dummy brick wall and a brushwood hedge. The steeplechase failed to become a permanent fixture in the industry.

The prestigious Pall Mall Stakes was set up in 1935 and became Harringay's feature competition. Shove Halfpenny, the first winner of the Pall Mall, switched kennels to Jack Harvey in 1937, finishing runner-up in the Derby final, and Eddie Wright steered Carmel Ash to second place in the 1939 Derby final.

With the advent of war, major competitions were badly hit, with many postponed until 1945; the 1940 Greyhound Derby was affected after White City cancelled the event despite the fact that it had already started on 15 June. The race was moved to Harringay, a move that did not go down well with many within the industry, and the press described it as being the forgotten Derby. Racing was restricted during the next four years,
with Saturday matinee meetings being the only fixtures.

Postwar history

In 1948 the popular totalisator board underwent extensive improvements, with the small stand next to the board being demolished and the tote doubled in size, displaying results automatically. Tote turnover in 1946 was a massive £11,046,994 second only to White City.

In the 1950s the grandstand received a glass front to accommodate a restaurant and offered 14 buffet bars and 10 licensed bars. Such was Harringay's reputation that in the 1950s Sporting Life called the track "the best running circuit in Britain". In 1957 Racing Manager Harold Ingleton retired and was replaced by Ken Obee from Stamford Bridge. In 1959 the Oaks was switched to Harringay from White City.

In 1961 the track heating system was introduced with electric cables sewn into the track by the tractor and a team of workers about eight inches under the turf. They would prove to be useful until the advent of all sand tracks. The track was able to use two hares, an 'Outside McGee' and 'Outside Sumner' and small hurdle races described as chases. Harringay held Bookmakers Afternoon Greyhound Service (BAGS) meetings from 1967 after being chosen as one of the tracks to host the service.

In late 1968 the stadium underwent a facelift with new stands, a new track surface with improved banking, and new distances of 450, 725, and 900 yards. Trainer Peter Hawkesley replaced the retiring Wilf France in 1970 and Jimmy Keane replaced Frank Melville in 1971 after he left for Rochester. In 1971 eight dog racing was trialed and one year later Harringay dogs had a brief spell of fame when the stadium became the home of Greyhound racing on London Weekend Television's World of Sport between 1972 and 1982.

Westpark Mustard completed win number seven on her way to 20 consecutive wins in 1974 and a new major competition called the Golden Jacket was inaugurated at the track in 1975. Ballyregan Bob appeared during December 1985 and twice in November 1986, all three wins formed part of the magical 32 world record (two of them track records).

Decline and Closure
By 1986 plans to sell most of the site had already been announced and the managing director of the GRA, Charles Chandler promised a new, smaller stadium on the site, modelled on the Stamford Bridge track. The plan failed to materialise.
In 1987 the GRA were taken over by Wembley plc and with the stadium valued at £1 million per acre and with a 23-acre site the sale plans accelerated.   The last greyhound meeting was held on 25 September 1987 and the last winner was 6–1 shot Davdor Darra.
The famous totalisator board was dismantled and parts of it went to the Science Museum at Wroughton, Swindon. The site which was acquired by the local council and McAlpine Homes is subject to various appeals before being demolished and making way for 220 homes and a Sainsburys superstore.

Competitions
 The Oaks (an original classic race)
 Pall Mall Stakes
 Golden Jacket
 National Sprint
 Produce Stakes

Track records

Pre Metric records

Post Metric records

Cheetah racing at Harringay
In 1937, Harringay Stadium was part of a scheme by the owner of the Romford Stadium, Arthur Leggett, to increase attendance at his venue. Twelve cheetahs were imported into the UK from Kenya in December 1936 by explorer Kenneth Gandar-Dower. After six months' quarantine the cheetahs were given a year to acclimatise and for training at Harringay and Staines stadia. The cheetahs ran in public for the first time to a packed house at the Romford track, on Saturday, 11 December 1937. Two races were held.

The experiment failed and the racing stopped because although the cheetahs were able to better the greyhound times they had to be let off first when racing greyhounds and when they raced against each other they became disinterested and stopped chasing the lure.

Speedway

A speedway track was laid inside the greyhound track and speedway events began at Harringay Stadium on 29 May 1928, three months after the first speedway event was held in the UK. After four years, with mixed success, the events were discontinued. However, they resumed in 1935 and, after a break during the war, speedway events ran from 4 April 1947 until 1954. During the 1930s, many events were promoted by sports promoter Tom Bradbury-Pratt.

The home team was known as the Harringay Canaries, then the Harringay Tigers, and finally the Harringay Racers. Australian Vic Duggan was the top star from 1947 to 1950. When he retired Split Waterman took over as Racers star rider.

The huge postwar popularity of speedway declined through the early 1950s and Harringay was one of many tracks that discontinued their involvement in the sport in that period. The stadium was last used for speedway when it staged the Provincial League Riders' Championship on 16 September 1961.

In 1950, with a gap to fill in their schedule, the promoters of the speedway staged an unofficial "Australian Championship" with the top Australian riders competing in Britain at the time (the field included Ronnie Moore, who although born in Australia, grew up in New Zealand and raced as a New Zealander). Other riders in the meeting included Aub Lawson, Jack Young, Vic Duggan, Bill Longley, Lionel Levy, Graham Warren and Bob Leverenz. Graham Warren won the "Australian Championship" from Aub Lawson and future dual World Champion Jack Young.

Stock car racing
BriSCA Formula 1 Stock Cars Racing was first held at Harringay stadium in 1954–55. After a break of five years, racing resumed in 1960 and continued off and on, until 1979.

The first BriSCA Formula 1 Stock Cars World Championship world final for stock cars took place at Harringay on 24 June 1955, won by Mac McDonnell. The World Final returned to Harringay in 1963, won by Doug Wardropper, in 1967, won by George Ansell, in 1970, won by Jim Esau and for the last time in 1973, won by Dave Chisholm.

In 1979 the stadium enjoyed a brief spell of fame of a different kind when a stock car event at the stadium was used as one of the locations for the film The Long Good Friday.

Banger racing (in which team tactics and more deliberate interception of opposing cars was permitted) also flourished at the stadium, featuring teams such as the North London Teddy Bears and the "Ahern Rats". The last Banger world final at Harringay took place in 1979.

Other uses
There were a range of occasional events including the Hollywood Motor Rodeo in May 1955  and local school sports days from the early 1950s until 1964.

Historical notes

Historical accounts paint a colourful picture of life around the stadium. Joe Coral, the founder of Coral Bookmakers, started his business at Harringay Stadium and other similar venues. Coral is supposed to have come up against organised crime boss Darby Sabini at Harringay but held his ground by holding a gun to Sabini's stomach.

Contemporary newspaper reports suggest that the crowds at the stadium could also be prone to violent disorder. There were at least three documented incidents of serious crowd disorder between 1938 and 1957. On 14 May 1938, when speedway racing was stopped early due to an accident, a crowd of 2,000 demanded their money back. When their demands were ignored the crowd broke onto the track, smashing and damaging parts of the stadium and setting fire to the track's tractor.

Eight years later a crowd attending a greyhound racing event ran riot after a second-placed dog was disqualified. According to The Guardian, the crowd

In June 1957 another disqualification provoked a further riot at a greyhound racing event. Similar levels of disorder as the previous riot were dealt with on this occasion by firemen from six fire appliances who turned their hoses on the crowd. Apparently the angry crowd was quickly dispersed, but they left quite a trail of destruction.

Closure and demolition

The popularity of greyhound racing started to decline in the 1960s. Both this and some poor investment decisions by the GRA left the company almost £20 million in debt by 1975. In spite of this, the company was talking about major investment in Harringay as late as 1970. However, it had also been in talks with "a leading supermarket chain" about the sale of the land as early as 1967. In any event the stadium received little investment and as a result became quickly dilapidated.

In line with its property disinvestment strategy, the GRA sold the Harringay site in 1985 to Sainsbury's for £10.5 million. Two years later, on 27 September 1987, the stadium finally closed down. The site was cleared and in its place a Sainsbury's store and some new housing was built. The only remaining trace of the stadium is a very small area of open land to the south and east of the Sainsbury's car park, called Harringay Stadium Slopes.

References

External links
Harringay Online's Harringay Timeline
Harringay greyhound racing photo archive at TopFoto 
TopFoto photo archive of Billy Graham's 1954 visit to Harringay Arena with opening show at Harringay Stadium 
The Julius Totalisator at Harringay Stadium
Video clips of Julius Totalisator
Harringay Online – a local networking site with much information about Harringay
Speedway Researcher

Sports venues in London
Defunct speedway venues in England
Defunct greyhound racing venues in the United Kingdom
Demolished buildings and structures in London
Sports venues completed in 1927
History of the London Borough of Haringey
Former buildings and structures in the London Borough of Haringey
Defunct sports venues in London
Sports venues demolished in 1987
1927 establishments in England
1987 disestablishments in England
Defunct greyhound racing venues in London
History of Middlesex
Demolished sports venues in the United Kingdom
Greyhound racing in London